VRN may refer to:

 The IATA airport code for Verona Airport, Italy
 The ICAO airline code for Varig, Brazil
 Video Rich Navigation
 Vehicle Registration Number
Verkehrsverbund Rhein-Neckar
Valued Receiving Note